General Harper may refer to:

George Harper (British Army officer) (1865–1922), British Army lieutenant general
Joseph H. Harper (1901–1990), U.S. Army major general
Kenton Harper (1801–1867), Virginia Provisional Army brigadier general on the side of the Confederacy in the American Civil War
Robert Goodloe Harper (1765–1825), U.S. Army major general